Deepdale is a side valley of Dentdale in the Yorkshire Dales National Park in Cumbria, England.  It lies north west of the summit of Whernside.

The dale is accessible by a narrow road which runs from Dent south to Kingsdale and Ingleton.

Valleys of Cumbria
Yorkshire Dales